Laloaoa Milford is a Samoan former professional rugby league and rugby union footballer who played in the 1990s and 2000s. He most recently played rugby union for the Santa Monica Rugby Club.  He was hired as the head coach for the University of Southern California Rugby Club in August, 2015. He represented Samoa.

Rugby league career
Milford started his career with the Sydney Tigers in 1996.  Milford made his first grade debut for the club in Round 19 1996 against Manly-Warringah which ended in a 18-0 loss at Brookvale Oval.

At the end of 1996, Balmain dropped the "Sydney Tigers" name and reverted to their original name.  The club also returned to Leichhardt Oval after spending 2 seasons at Parramatta Stadium.  

Milford played 38 games for the club between 1996 and 1999.  Milford played in Balmain's final game as a stand-alone entity which was against the Canberra Raiders at Bruce Stadium in Round 26 1999.  Balmain lost the match 42-14.

In 2000, he joined the squad of the merged Wests Tigers club, but only played in one first grade match.  

Between 2001 and 2003 Milford played for the Pia Donkeys, and in 2001 he played in the final of the Lord Derby Cup.

In 2002, Milford played for the Cabramatta Two Blues in the Jim Beam Cup.

In 2003, he returned to the National Rugby League, playing for the Cronulla-Sutherland Sharks.  Milford's final game in the top grade came in Round 19 2003 which was against the New Zealand Warriors at Shark Park.  Cronulla lost the match 31-24.

Representative career
Milford played for Samoa in the 2000 World Cup.

Rugby union career
Milford went to France in 2004, signing for rugby union club, Aviron Bayonnais. In 2005 he joined Castres Olympique.

References

External links
Laloa Milford Scrum.com
Milford Laloa RugbyRama.fr

1976 births
Living people
Samoan rugby league players
Samoa national rugby league team players
Balmain Tigers players
Wests Tigers players
Cronulla-Sutherland Sharks players
Samoan rugby union coaches
Samoan rugby union players
Baroudeurs de Pia XIII players
Rugby league wingers
Rugby league fullbacks
Samoan expatriate rugby union players
Expatriate rugby union players in France
Samoan expatriate sportspeople in France
Samoan expatriate sportspeople in Australia